Pont-Sondé is a town in the communal section of Bocozelle in the Saint-Marc commune, in the Artibonite department of Haiti.

Pont-Sondé is located on an important crossroads through which passes including the road linking the capital Port-au-Prince to the second largest city of Cap-Haïtien in the northern coast. The town developed around a bridge over the bank of the Artibonite River. This standard bridge was built in 1880 with a range of 90 meters. It is also an important market which is held along the road and on the bridge over the Artibonite River.

Agriculture
Pont-Sondé is the leading producer of rice in Haiti.

References

Populated places in Artibonite (department)